The Columbia River Gorge is a canyon of the Columbia River in the Pacific Northwest of the United States. Extending roughly from the confluence of the Columbia with the Deschutes River (and the towns of Roosevelt, Washington, and Arlington, Oregon) in the east down to the eastern reaches of the Portland metropolitan area, the water gap furnishes the only navigable route through the Cascades and the only water connection between the Columbia Plateau and the Pacific Ocean. It is thus that the routes of Interstate 84, U.S. Route 30, Washington State Route 14, and railroad tracks on both sides run through the gorge.

A popular recreational destination, the gorge holds federally protected status as the Columbia River Gorge National Scenic Area and is managed by the Columbia River Gorge Commission and the U.S. Forest Service.

Description
The Columbia River, Klamath River in northern California, Pit River in northern California, and Fraser River in southern British Columbia are the only four rivers connecting the watersheds on the east side of the Cascade Range to the Pacific Ocean. Each river has created a gorge through the Cascades. The Columbia River Gorge marks the state line between Oregon and Washington, and its wide range of elevation and precipitation makes it an extremely diverse and dynamic place. Isolated micro-habitats have allowed for many species of endemic plants and animals to prosper, including at least 13 endemic wildflowers.

The gorge transitions between temperate rainforest to dry grasslands in only , hosting a dramatic change in scenery while driving along Interstate 84. In the western, temperate rainforest areas, forests are marked by bigleaf maples, Douglas fir, and western hemlock, all covered in epiphytes. In the transition zone (between Hood River and The Dalles), vegetation turns to Oregon white oak, ponderosa pine, and cottonwood. At the eastern end, the forests make way for expansive grasslands, with occasional pockets of lodgepole and ponderosa pine.

Atmospheric pressure differentials east and west of the Cascades create a wind tunnel effect in the deep cut of the gorge, generating  winds that make it a popular windsurfing and kiteboarding location. It also creates the right conditions for snow and ice storms during the winter months which also draw very cold east winds toward the mouth of the gorge on the west end.

The gorge is a popular destination for hiking, biking, sightseeing, fishing, and water sports. The area is known for its high concentration of waterfalls, with over 90 on the Oregon side of the gorge alone. Many are along the Historic Columbia River Highway, including the notable  Multnomah Falls.

Trails and day use sites are maintained by the Forest Service and many Oregon and Washington state parks.

Geology
The Columbia River Gorge began forming as far back as the Miocene (roughly 17 to 12 million years ago), and continued to take shape through the Pleistocene (2 million to 700,000 years ago).

Although the river slowly eroded the land over this period of time, the most drastic changes took place at the end of the last ice age when the Missoula Floods cut the steep, dramatic walls that exist today, flooding the river as high up as Crown Point. This quick erosion left many layers of volcanic rock exposed.

Ecology
The Columbia River Gorge is home to a number of plant species that are endemic or found mostly in the gorge and surrounding areas, including Heterotheca villosa, Lomatium columbianum, Lomatium klickitatense, Lomatium suksdorfii, Penstemon barrettiae, and Primula poetica.

History
The gorge has supported human habitation for over 13,000 years. Evidence of the Folsom and Marmes people, who crossed the Bering land bridge from Asia, were found in archaeological digs. Excavations near Celilo Falls, a few miles east of The Dalles, show humans have occupied this salmon-fishing site for more than 10,000 years.

The gorge has provided a transportation corridor for thousands of years. Native Americans would travel through the gorge to trade at Celilo Falls, both along the river and over Lolo Pass on the north side of Mount Hood. In 1805, the route was used by the Lewis and Clark Expedition to reach the Pacific. Early European and American settlers subsequently established steamboat lines and railroads through the gorge. Today, the BNSF Railway runs freights along the Washington side of the river, while its rival, the Union Pacific Railroad, runs freights along the Oregon shore. Until 1997, Amtrak's Pioneer also used the Union Pacific tracks. The Portland segment of the Empire Builder uses the BNSF tracks that pass through the gorge.

The Columbia River Highway, built in the early 20th century, was the first major paved highway in the Pacific Northwest. Shipping was greatly simplified after Bonneville Dam and The Dalles Dam submerged the gorge's major rapids such as Celilo Falls, a major salmon fishing site for local Native Americans until the site's submergence in 1957.

In November 1986, Congress made the gorge the second U.S. National Scenic Area and established the Columbia River Gorge Commission as part of an interstate compact. The experimental designation came in lieu of being recognized as a national park, which would require the existing industries in towns along the river to relocate. The designation was initially opposed by residents fearing government encroachment, due to restrictions in the plan for items such as building paint colors, and was also opposed by conservationists who feared additional development in the region. In 2004, the gorge became the namesake of the Columbia Gorge American Viticultural Area, a  area located on both sides of the river.

In fall 2017, the Eagle Creek Fire burned in the gorge for three months, consuming almost . It reached 100% containment on November 30, 2017, but was not yet completely out.

Gallery

See also 
 Barlow Road, the first wagon-compatible pioneer road to provide a safer alternative to traveling through the gorge
 Cascades Rapids
 Proposed Columbia Gorge casino, a proposed off-reservation casino in Cascade Locks
 Wahclella Falls
Nancy Neighbor Russell, conservationist and co-founder of Friends of the Columbia Gorge

References

External links

U.S. Forest Service - Columbia River Gorge National Scenic Area
Columbia River Gorge Commission
The Gorge Magazine

Portland State University Columbia River Gorge National Scenic Area Collection—contains research material used to write the book Planning a New West: The Columbia River Gorge National Scenic Area
The River They Saw Documentary produced by Oregon Public Broadcasting

 

 
Archaeological sites in Oregon
Archaeological sites in Washington (state)
Valleys of Oregon
Valleys of Washington (state)
Protected areas of Clark County, Washington
Columbia River
Protected areas of Hood River County, Oregon
Protected areas of Klickitat County, Washington
Protected areas of Multnomah County, Oregon
National scenic areas
Protected areas of Sherman County, Oregon
Protected areas of Skamania County, Washington
Protected areas of Wasco County, Oregon
Mount Hood National Forest
Landforms of Clark County, Washington
Landforms of Hood River County, Oregon
Landforms of Klickitat County, Washington
Landforms of Multnomah County, Oregon
Landforms of Sherman County, Oregon
Landforms of Skamania County, Washington
Landforms of Wasco County, Oregon
United States Forest Service protected areas
Water gaps of Washington
Water gaps of the United States